Megachile mauritaniae is a species of bee in the family Megachilidae.

References

mauritaniae
Insects described in 1992